David Staff (born 8 November 1979) is an English footballer, born in Market Harborough, who played in the Football League for Boston United. He is currently a coach at Brackley Town .

Before joining Boston United in August 2004, Staff played non-league football for clubs including Rushden & Diamonds, Stamford and King's Lynn, who he joined on transfer deadline day in 2002, making his Linnets debut on 1 April 2002 against Cambridge City. Despite King's Lynn's relegation to the Southern League Eastern Division at the end of that season, Staff remained with The Linnets. He initially played in a midfield role which he hated because he was lazy and hated running, but latterly became utilized in a more attacking role. He scored 20 goals in all competitions in the 2002/03 season, and was King's Lynn's leading scorer in the 2003/04 season with 23 goals in all competitions, helping King's Lynn to the Southern League Eastern Division title and promotion back to the Premier Division. "Staffster" was seen as something of a dead-ball specialist and a number of his goals came from goal kicks. In February 2004 he scored directly from a corner kick in King's Lynn's 4–1 victory over Banbury United. He left King's Lynn for Boston United in the summer of 2004, making his Football League debut on 21 August 2004 as a very late substitute in the League Two game against Macclesfield Town which finished 1–1, but failed to establish himself in Boston's first team and returned to King's Lynn. Described as a " versatile attacking midfielder", Staff went on to play for Nuneaton Borough, Cambridge City on loan, Rugby Town, initially on loan, Brackley Town, before returning to Rugby Town in January 2009.

Staff appeared on Sky One's game-show Gladiators, which he won, before also winning on the 'Champion of Champions' show. He works as a sports coach for Kettering Borough Council and Moulton College in Northamptonshire.

References

External links
 

1979 births
Living people
People from Market Harborough
Footballers from Leicestershire
English footballers
Association football midfielders
Gladiators (1992 British TV series)
Rushden & Diamonds F.C. players
Stamford A.F.C. players
King's Lynn F.C. players
Boston United F.C. players
Nuneaton Borough F.C. players
Cambridge City F.C. players
Rugby Town F.C. players
English Football League players
Southern Football League players
Northern Premier League players